Lecithocera dondavisi is a moth in the family Lecithoceridae. It is found in Taiwan.

Description
The forewings are pale grayish orange, speckled with fine dark-brown scales, more dense posteriorly. The hindwings are pale gray and broader than the forewings.

Etymology
The species is named after Donald R. Davis, curator of Lepidoptera at the National Museum of Natural History, Smithsonian Institution, United States, an authority on the microlepidoptera of the world.

References

dondavisi
Moths of Taiwan
Endemic fauna of Taiwan
Moths described in 2013